Peter van Eyck (born Götz von Eick; 16 July 191115 July 1969) was a German-born film actor. He was perhaps best known (in English-language films) for his roles in the 1960s features The Spy Who Came in from the Cold, Shalako and The Bridge at Remagen.

Biography
Van Eyck was born into an aristocratic German family from Pomerania (since 1945 part of Poland). After graduating from high school he studied music in Berlin. 

While studying music in Berlin, Van Eyck purportedly had a brief liaison with Jean Ross, a cabaret singer who inspired the fictional character of Sally Bowles. Ross became pregnant with Eyck's child and, when Eyck departed Weimar-era Berlin, Ross had an abortion authorized by gay author Christopher Isherwood who falsely claimed to be her impregnator. These factual events served as the genesis for a short story by Isherwood which later became the 1937 novella Sally Bowles and was later adapted into the  1966 Cabaret musical and the 1972 film of the same name.

In 1931, after leaving Berlin, Van Eyck lived in Paris, London, Tunis, Algiers and Cuba, before settling in New York. He earned a living playing the piano in a bar, and wrote and composed for revues and cabarets, including several songs for Madame Spivy with lyricist John LaTouche. He worked for Irving Berlin as a stage manager and production assistant, and for Orson Welles Mercury Theatre company as an assistant director.

Van Eyck went to Hollywood where he worked as a truck driver. He initially found radio work with the help of Billy Wilder, who later gave him small film roles. In 1943, he took US citizenship and was drafted into the U.S. Army as a commissioned officer. At the end of World War II, he returned to Germany as a control officer for film and remained there until 1948 as director of the film section. He completed training at Camp Ritchie and is considered to be one of the Ritchie Boys.  In 1949, he appeared in his first German film Hallo, Fräulein!

He gained international recognition with a leading role in the 1953 film Le Salaire de la peur (The Wages of Fear) directed by Henri-Georges Clouzot. He went on to appear in episodes of several US TV series including The Adventures of Ellery Queen and Alfred Hitchcock Presents. In English-language films he was most often typecast as a Nazi or other unsympathetic type, while in Germany he was a popular leading man in a wider range of films, including several appearances in the Doctor Mabuse thriller series of the 1960s.

Personal life
Van Eyck was married to the American actress Ruth Ford for a short time in the 1940s. With his second wife, Inge von Voris, he had two daughters, also an actor, and Claudia.

Death
He died in 1969 in Männedorf, Switzerland, of septicaemia, caused by an untreated relatively minor injury. a day before his 58th birthday.

Selected filmography

 Hitler's Children (1943) — Arresting Sergeant (uncredited)
 The Moon Is Down (1943) — Lieutenant Tonder 
 Edge of Darkness (1943) — German Soldier (uncredited)
 Five Graves to Cairo (1943) — Lieutenant Schwegler
 Action in the North Atlantic (1943) — German Ensign (uncredited)
 Hitler's Madman (1943) — Gestapo (uncredited)
 The Impostor (1944) — Hafner
 Address Unknown (1944) — Heinrich Schulz
 Resisting Enemy Interrogation (1944) — Capt. Granach - Young Nazi Officer (uncredited)
 Hello, Fraulein! (1949) — Tom Keller
 Royal Children (1950) — Paul König
 Blondes for Export (1950) — Rolf Carste
 The Orplid Mystery (1950) — Steward Stefan Lund
 Furioso (1950) —  Peter von Rhoden
 Third from the Right (1950) — Renato
 The Desert Fox: The Story of Rommel (1951) — German officer (uncredited)
 Heart of the Casbah (1952) — Jo
 The Wages of Fear (1953) — Bimba
 Sailor of the King, also known as Single-Handed (1953) — Kapitän Ludvik von Falk
  Alarm in Morocco (1953) — Howard
 La chair et le diable (1953) — Mathias Valdès
 Night People (1954) — Capt. Sergei "Petey" Petrochine
 Flesh and the Woman (1954) — Fred
 Tarzan's Hidden Jungle (1955) — Dr. Celliers
 A Bullet for Joey (1955) — Eric Hartman
  (1955) — Franck Richter
 Mr. Arkadin (1955) — Thaddeus
 Jump into Hell (1955) — Lt. Heinrich Heldman
 The Cornet (1955) —  Mönchschreiber
 The Rawhide Years (1956) — Andre Boucher
 Run for the Sun (1956) — Dr. Van Anders / Colonel Von Andre
 Attack! (1956) — SS Captain
 Burning Fuse (1957) — Pedro Wassewich
  (1957) — Peter Simon
 Retour de manivelle (1957) — Eric Fréminger
 The Glass Tower (1957) — John Lawrence
 Anyone Can Kill Me (1957) — Cyril Glad
 Doctor Crippen Lives (1958) — Kriminalkommissar Léon Ferrier
 Rosemary (1958) — Alfons Fribert
 Schmutziger Engel (1958) — Studienrat Dr. Torsten Agast
 The Snorkel (1958) — Paul Decker
  (1958) — Alexandre
  (1959) — Alexander
 Rommel Calls Cairo (1959) — Capt. Graf von Almassy
  (1959) — Karl Amsel
 The Rest Is Silence (1959) — Generaldirektor Paul Claudius
 Crime After School (1959) — Dr. Knittel
 Labyrinth (1959) — Ron Stevens
 The Black Chapel (1959) — Robert Golder
 Rebel Flight to Cuba (1959) — Captain Pink Roberti
 Sweetheart of the Gods (1960) — Dr. Hans Simon
 The Thousand Eyes of Dr. Mabuse (1960) — Henry B. Travers
 Foxhole in Cairo (1960) — Cont Almasky
 World in My Pocket (1961) — Bleck
  (1961) — Hauptmann Langenau
  (1961) — Michel Georgenko
  (1961) — Bönisch
 Blind Justice (1961) — Prosecutor Dr. Robert Kessler
  (1962) — Dr. Fred Calonder
 The Devil's Agent (1962) — Georg Droste
 The Longest Day (1962) — Lt. Col. Ocker
 The Brain (1962) — Dr. Peter Corrie
 Station Six-Sahara (1962) — Kramer
 Ostrava (1963) — Peter
 Scotland Yard Hunts Dr. Mabuse (1963) — Major Bill Tern
  (1963) — Chef
 An Alibi for Death (1963) — Günther Rohn
 The Secret of Dr. Mabuse (1964) — Maj. Bob Anders
 The River Line (1964) — Major Barton
 Kidnapped to Mystery Island (1964) — Captain McPherson
 The Spy Who Came in from the Cold (1965) — Hans-Dieter Mundt
 The Dirty Game (1965) — Petchatkin
 Die Herren (1965) — Colonel - episode 'Die Soldaten'
 Duel at Sundown (1965) — Don McGow
 Living It Up (1966) — Peter von Kessner
 Requiem for a Secret Agent (1966) — Oscar Rubeck
 High Season for Spies (1966)—  Kramer / Jack Haskins
  (1967, TV film) — Ivar Kreuger
  (1967) — Muller
 Red Roses for the Fuhrer (1968) — Oberst Kerr
 Tevye and His Seven Daughters (1968) — Priest
 Assignment to Kill (1968) — Walter Green
 Shalako (1968) — Baron Frederick Von Hallstatt
 The Bridge at Remagen (1969) — Generaloberst von Brock (final film role)

References

External links

 
 Photographs of Peter van Eyck

1911 births
1969 deaths
People from Chojna
People from the Province of Pomerania
German emigrants to the United States
German male film actors
United States Army Air Forces officers
First Motion Picture Unit personnel
20th-century German male actors
Infectious disease deaths in Switzerland
Deaths from sepsis
Ritchie Boys